Jack Weston (born Morris Weinstein; August 21, 1924 – May 3, 1996) was an American actor. He was nominated for a Golden Globe Award in 1976 and a Tony Award in 1981.

Career
Weston, a native of Cleveland, Ohio, usually played comic roles in films such as Cactus Flower (1969) and Please Don't Eat the Daisies (1960). He occasionally took on heavier parts, such as the scheming crook and stalker, who along with Alan Arkin and Richard Crenna attempts to terrorize and rob a blind Audrey Hepburn in the 1967 film Wait Until Dark.

Weston had numerous other character roles over 25 years, including in major films such as The Cincinnati Kid (1965), The Thomas Crown Affair (1968), Gator (1976), Cuba (1979), High Road to China (1983), Dirty Dancing (1987), Ishtar (1987), and Short Circuit 2 (1988).

On television, he made numerous appearances, such as murderer Fred Calvert in the 1958 Perry Mason episode, "The Case of the Daring Decoy".   In 1961, he was a guest star in the TV drama Route 66, playing the manager of a traveling group of young women nightclub dancers who mistreats his employees. In 1963, he was a guest star in an episode called "Fatso" in the TV drama The Fugitive.

In 1976, he was nominated for a Golden Globe Award for Best Actor in a Motion Picture – Musical or Comedy for his performance in the film The Ritz.  In 1981, Weston appeared on Broadway in Woody Allen's comedy The Floating Light Bulb, for which he was nominated for a Tony Award as Best Actor. His other stage appearances include Bells are Ringing in 1956 (with Judy Holliday), The Ritz in 1975, Neil Simon's California Suite (1976) and One Night Stand in 1980.

Weston co-starred in Alan Alda's 1981 film The Four Seasons, and then reprised his role to star in a television series spinoff on CBS.

Personal life
By age 12, Weston was performing at the Cleveland Playhouse as a member of its "Curtain Pullers" youth program. He also appeared in school productions at Parkwood Elementary, Patrick Henry Jr. High, and Glenville High School. Joining the Army in 1943, he served for 28 months, mostly in Italy with the 34th Infantry Division. After the war, he again appeared at the Playhouse in 1945 as Jack Weinstein and then moved to New York, where former Playhouse director K. Elmo Lowe helped him obtain work managing a USO troupe touring Japan, China, Okinawa, and Korea. 

Afterward, in New York, he joined the American Theatre Wing with Lee Strasberg. He did not advance far professionally and returned to Cleveland, where he met Marge Redmond, another local actress, and the pair relocated to New York and were married there in 1950. Redmond was later noted for her role in the ABC sitcom The Flying Nun. They occasionally appeared together, an example being a 1963 episode of The Twilight Zone titled "The Bard". Redmond and Weston divorced in the 1980s. The couple had no children.

Weston's second marriage was to Laurie Gilkes, and they had one child together. They were married until his death from lymphoma on May 3, 1996, after a six-year struggle. He was 71 years old.

Jack was the older brother of Anthony Spinelli, whose birth name was Sam Weinstein and whose first stage name was Sam Weston. The Westons were Jewish.

Selected filmography

 Stage Struck (1958) as Frank
 Peter Gunn (1958), "The Kill" (S1E01) as Dave Green
 I Want to Live! (1958) as NCO at Party (uncredited)
 Imitation of Life (1959) as Tom
 Please Don't Eat the Daisies (1960) as Joe Positano
 All in a Night's Work (1961) as Lasker
 The Honeymoon Machine (1961) as Signalman Burford Taylor
 It's Only Money (1962) as Leopold
 Palm Springs Weekend (1963) as Coach Fred Campbell
 The Incredible Mr. Limpet (1964) as George Stickle
 The Cincinnati Kid (1965) as Pig
 Mirage (1965) as Lester
 Wait Until Dark (1967) as Carlino
 The Thomas Crown Affair (1968) as Erwin Weaver
 The April Fools (1969) as Potter Shrader
 Cactus Flower (1969) as Harvey Greenfield
 A New Leaf (1971) as Andy McPherson
 Fuzz (1972) as Det. Meyer Meyer
 Marco (1973) as Maffio Polo
 The Ritz (1976) as Gaetano Proclo
 Gator (1976) as Irving Greenfield
 Cuba (1979) as Larry Gutman
 Can't Stop the Music (1980) as Benny Murray
 The Four Seasons (1981) as Danny Zimmer
 High Road to China (1983) as Struts
 The Longshot (1986) as Elton
 Rad (1986) as Duke Best
 Dirty Dancing (1987) as Max Kellerman
 Ishtar (1987) as Marty Freed
 Short Circuit 2 (1988) as Oscar Baldwin

Television appearances
In 1949, Weston appeared as Mr. Storm in episode five of Captain Video and His Video Rangers.

In 1953-54, he appeared as Wilbur Wormser on CBS-TV's Rod Brown of the Rocket Rangers, a Saturday-morning kiddie show, and he was often recognized on the street or subway by children in and around New York City.

In 1960, Weston appeared as Otto in Alfred Hitchcock Presents, episode 28, season five, called "Forty Detectives", on April 24, 1960.

In the 1960–1961 television season, Weston appeared as Chick Adams, a reporter, on the CBS sitcom My Sister Eileen.

The next season, he starred in the short-lived sitcom The Hathaways (ABC), in which  Peggy Cass and he adopted three chimpanzees (the Marquis Chimps).

He also made guest appearances on such television series as Peter Gunn, Perry Mason, Rescue 8, The Twilight Zone (episodes "The Monsters Are Due on Maple Street", and "The Bard"), The Untouchables, Have Gun – Will Travel, Johnny Staccato, Thriller, The Lawless Years (two episodes), Route 66, Harrigan and Son, Stoney Burke, Breaking Point, The Fugitive, Bewitched, Gunsmoke, Twelve O'Clock High, Laredo, Tales of the Unexpected, The Man from U.N.C.L.E., The Carol Burnett Show, All in the Family, and The George Burns and Gracie Allen Show.

References

External links

 
 
 
 
 

1924 births
1996 deaths
American male film actors
American male musical theatre actors
American male stage actors
American male television actors
Deaths from lymphoma
Deaths from cancer in New York (state)
20th-century American male actors
Male actors from Cleveland
Military personnel from Cleveland
Jewish American male actors
20th-century American singers
20th-century American male singers
United States Army personnel of World War II
20th-century American Jews